John 3:16 is the sixteenth verse in the third chapter of the Gospel of John, one of the four gospels in the New Testament. It is deemed one of the most popular verses from the Bible and is a summary of one of  Christianity's central doctrines; the relationship between the Father (God) and the Son of God (Jesus). Particularly famous among evangelical Protestants,  the verse has been frequently referenced by the Christian media and figures.

In the King James Version, it reads:

For God so loved the world, that He gave His only begotten Son, that whosoever believeth in Him should not perish, but have everlasting life.

John 3:16 appears in the conversation between Nicodemus, a Pharisee, who only appears in the gospel, and Jesus, the son of God, and shows the motives of God the Father on sending Jesus to save humanity.

Biblical context 

The third chapter of the Gospel of John begins with the conversation between Nicodemus, a Pharisee, and Jesus, a Jewish itinerant preacher. Nicodemus is never mentioned in the synoptic Gospels, and this is one of four times John mentions him: the others are 2:23–25, where he appeared but was unmentioned; 7:50; and 19:39. The meeting, likely in Jerusalem, is part of the passion of Jesus. Unlike Matthew, Mark, and Luke, the Gospel of John is the only one to mention Jesus' life not in chronological order.

Nicodemus was a member of the Pharisees, a Jewish religious movement in Second Temple Judaism. It was known for its strict adherence to the halakha (Jewish law), and for its highly oppositional attitudes of the ministry of Jesus. To avoid trouble with other Pharisees, Nicodemus came to Jesus at night; it is the only time a Pharisee is presented positively in the presence of Jesus. Later, Nicodemus became a follower of Jesus.

Nicodemus said he knew Jesus was "a teacher who came from God". He then added: "For no-one could perform the miraculous signs he was doing if God were not with him." They then discussed the need to be born again before being able to see the Kingdom of God and where the spirit goes after the death of the body. Jesus then spoke about salvation and of the damnation that those who do not believe in him will face. He also criticised Nicodemus for his lack in the understanding of theology.

Translations 
Some of translations for the verse have been provided as below:

Analysis

Exegesis 

John 3:16 has been termed as "the golden text of the Bible", "the gospel in a nutshell", and "everyman's text". One of the verses pivotal to the Johannine theology, it concerns God's motive for sending Jesus.  In Christianity, it is thought that believing in Jesus grants eternal life to the believer. Eternal life is a dominant theme throughout John's entire Gospel, and its first appearance in the Gospel is in this verse. Theologian Larry Hurtado sees the verse as reflecting Jesus' importance in Christianity. The Methodist minister C. K. Barrett wrote, "Mention of ... the eternal life given ... to believers ... suggests ... the general setting of the work of Christ in the love and judgement of God."

The verse (which has parallels with John 3:15 and John 3:17) has been used by some to support Christian universalism, a view that all humans will eventually be saved by God or denies eternal suffering in Hell. However, Anglican bishop N. T. Wright has argued against this saying: "[T]he position is quite clear: God in His great love has made one way of salvation for all men without exception. Those who refuse this way have no alternative left to them. And accepting the way of salvation, for John as for Paul, is bound up with faith in Jesus Christ."

Purpose 
The verse's purpose is assumed among theologians to be that of strengthening the faith of Christians rather than an evangelistic tool. This is caused by John 3:16 that does not contain commands of vital sacraments (such as repentance and baptism). In the words of theologian David Pawson, it is problematic to use a verse in evangelism that does not tell the hearers "how to respond in proper detail ... that you get a simple decision which is not enough for a real change in life ... It is not dealing with a gospel situation and outward evangelistic thrust". Instead, the emphasis of the verse is toward continuing belief for Christians.

Christian commentary 

John 3:16 has been popular for theology comments. In evangelist Andreas J. Köstenberger's opinion, the verse summarises central teachings in Christianity that are to put beliefs in Jesus, and "there is no middle ground: believing in the Son (resulting in eternal life) or refusing to believe (resulting in destruction) are the only options." Christian philosopher William Lane Craig said the verse denotes salvation through Jesus only. According to theologian Paul T. Butler: "God, motivated by infinite love, sent His only son ... not to condemn but to save everyone who believes in His Son ... This text shows God loving us, not for His sake alone, but for our sakes."

Biblical scholar F. F. Bruce interpreted John 3:16 that God has a limitless and universal love to all humans. Barrett noted that the salvation would only be advantageous whenever there is a belief in Jesus. Calvinist theologian D. A. Carson said the verse "makes it clear that, as applied to human beings, the love of God is not the consequence of their loveliness but of the sublime truth that 'God is love'." Theologian Robert E. Webber described it as "an invitation to embrace a sweeping story that encompassed the whole of history". Bible commentator J. Ramsey Michaels wrote: "God's intent is a saving intent, and the scope of his salvation is worldwide. His love for the whole human race expressed itself in the giving of his only Son [who would] die on the cross."

Bruce Vawter, a Catholic priest, stated: "The only explanation that we shall ever have of the gift of eternal life made possible for us in the redemption achieved in Christ is the incredible love of God for the world." Anglican priest Leon Morris compared the idea of God's universal love with God's exclusive love to Jews, which is frequently mentioned in the Old Testament. He then concluded that "it is a distinctively Christian idea that God's love is wide enough to embrace all mankind. His love is not confined to any national group or any spiritual elite. It is a love which proceeds from the fact that He is love." Presbyterian pastor Lamar Williamson found that John 3:16 emphasises the significance of Jesus in Christianity as God the Son. Catholic theologian Neal M. Flanagan said that the verse is pivotal to the Johannine theology.

Status as Jesus' words 
Beginning in John 3:21, the conversation becomes Jesus' monologue. Because ancient Bible copies do not use quotation marks for dialogues, biblical scholars have disputed on where Jesus and Nicodemus' conversation ends. Speculations that John 3:16 is the personal commentary of an evangelist (traditionally named John the Evangelist) have arisen, but it remains controversial. Pawson said it is unusual for Jesus to speak from the third-person perspective, or to repeat or expand on what he had said. Jesus never referred to himself as the "only begotten Son" but as the "Son of Man". The only begotten son is what the evangelist calls Jesus in John 1. Theologian Robert E. Van Voorst has commented that it is not important to know if John 3:16 is Jesus's words, and that words not spoken by Jesus are no less true than those that are.

Wording 
John 3:16's wording is deemed by Bible commentators to be straightforward, concise, and authoritative. The verse is only 25 words long in the King James Version. First, the verse begins with for to link with prior verse. God here is understood to be God the Father, the first person in the Trinity. The word so—similar to thus—shows a comparison from John 3:15. This is not a quantity but was mistranslated as such in most modern translations (for instance, in the Amplified Bible). Many scholars said the word should be placed near the beginning to keep the original meaning, as was in Koine Greek, the original Bible language:

Thus for loved God the world that the Son the only begotten, He gave so that everyone believing in Him not should perish but should have life eternal.

The next word is loved, known in Greek as agape. This concept does not have an equal word in English, but it can be translated as the selfless, nonsexual love of God for human and of human for God. While some theologians have argued that world refers to only Israel, other theologians have generally agreed that it means the entire human race, showing God's unlimited and universal love for both believers and unbelievers. Pawson suggested there should be a better alternative to world, because he thought it connotes an immoral meaning. Sharing similar sentiments, Harris remarked, "Often in this Gospel there are ominous, negative ideas attaching to the term. The world is evil and needs a saviour." The verb gave, in past tense, does not have a clear subject; Pawson assumed that the word refers to the prior world.

The word whosoever refers to believers, specified by "believeth in Him". Whether the objective pronoun Him refers to Jesus or God the Father is debated; general consensus among the analysts is more inclined to the former. The word perish is interpreted by theologians as annihilation, though it is unclear if the word refers the perishing of death or the Last Judgement. Köstenberger stated perish meant living eternally in God's absence, and Pawson stated it as "a state of ruin or utter uselessness". The meaning of everlasting has been controversial. Theologian Marianne Thompson said it does not mean solely "unending: it is qualitatively different from mortal life in the present world, because it participates in the blessings of the coming age, including being with God, who is living and eternal ... such life is characterized by fullness and abundance"; though according to the New Testament professor Merrill C. Tenney the word refers to imperishability.

"Only begotten" 
The Gospel of John uses lexically and syntactically unsophisticated language, and has a significant number of theologically laden phrases that have become an important part of Christianity. John 3:16 also contains the designation for Jesus as the "only begotten", a key Christological title in the pre-modern versions of the English Bible, which has almost completely disappeared from most contemporary translations. The original word, monogens, has a complex etymological analysis, and there is no consensus among scholars on its exact development and meaning. The phrase "only begotten" is traceable to the Latin translation made by the Church Father Jerome in the late fourth century called the Biblia vulgata. Jerome translated the Greek adjective monogens into the Latin cognate unigenitus, which recurred in English translations as "only begotten" for almost six centuries.

The "only begotten Son" shows a deep relationship between God the Father and God the Son (Jesus). However, post-1950s translations changed it to "only Son" or "one and only Son"; this met criticism for setting aside the virgin birth of Jesus to his mother Mary. Dale Moody of the Journal of Biblical Literature offered two alternatives for John 3:16: "Only one of his kind" (from  [monos, one] and  [genos, kind]), or "his 'unique' son". The author Paul Borthwick wrote "only begotten Son" signifies that Jesus possesses "every artibute of pure Godhood"; Pawson, however, argued that the phrase stated Jesus is not everlasting. Theologian Pheme Perkins believed the phrase "He gave His only begotten Son" could be a reference to his later crucifixion, an opinion shared by Murray J. Harris and Robert E. Van Voorst.

Muslim commentary 
The validity of Jesus' status as the "only begotten son" of God, as described in John 3:16, has been disputed by Muslim scholars especially, who deny the Trinity and consider such concepts as a denial of tawhid (oneness of God). Gombe State University's Yakubu Modibbo and University of Maiduguri's Dani Mamman claimed other verses from the Bible that, they believed, are an affirmation of other "begotten sons" of God, and thus contradict Jesus' words or John's commentary; Psalms 2:7 for example, which reads, "I will tell of the decree: The Lord said to me, 'You are my Son; today I have begotten you'." They added that, despite unambiguous, "Christians still regards all the biblical sons of God as adopted sons by God, through faith in Jesus." However, the Christian apologist A. Yousef Al-Katib wrote that it is actually a reference to the coming son of God, who in Christian theology is identified as Jesus; he also wrote of Acts 13:33 that quotes the verse to prove Jesus' divine sonship.

Influences 

John 3:16 is considered to be a popular Bible verse and acknowledged as a summary of the gospel. In the United States, the verse is often used by preachers during sermons and widely memorised among evangelical churches' members. 16th-century German Protestant theologian Martin Luther said the verse is "the gospel in miniature". The author Max Lucado, who described the verse as "a twenty-[five] word parade of hope", wrote in 2007 that the conciseness of the verse made it easy to remember. In 2014, John 3:16 is among ten most-searched verses in BibleGateway.com, a popular Bible website. In a 2017 report by Christianity Today, the verse is a popular choice for passwords.

The verse has been frequently referenced by consumer products and public figures. In the United States, where Christianity is dominant, evangelists often write "John 3:16" on signs and walls to attract people's attention. Voorst added, "They hope that some people will recognise as a Bible reference, look up the verse, and come to faith in Jesus Christ." The American footballer Tim Tebow wrote John 3:16 on the eye black during the 2009 BCS National Championship Game, making it the most popular search term for more than 24 hours. The verse has been printed on the shopping bags by Forever 21 fashion retailer and on paper cups' bottom by In-N-Out Burger fast-food chain.

Many books have been written that are based on John 3:16. Lutheran computer scientist Donald Knuth published 3:16 Bible Texts Illuminated in 1991, examining and illustrating sixteenth verses of every third chapter in the Bible books. In 2009, Lucado wrote 3:16: The Numbers of Hope, where portions of the verse is titled in its chapters. Pawson wrote Is John 3:16 the Gospel?, where he analyses every words and grammatical structure of the verse and remarked as the "most misunderstood verse". John 3:16: What's It All About? and Mission 3:16, were written by Harris in 2015 and Borthwick in 2020 respectively.

Notes

References

Bibliography 

 
 
 
 
 
 
 
 
 
 
 
 
 
 
 
 
 
 
 
 
 
 
 
 
 
 
 
 
 
 
 
 
 
 
 
 
 

Book chapters

 
 
 
 
 
 
 

John 3
Nicodemus